Johan Motin (born October 10, 1989) is a Swedish professional ice hockey defenceman. He is currently playing with HIFK of the Finnish Liiga. Motin was selected by the Edmonton Oilers in the 4th round (103rd overall) of the 2008 NHL Entry Draft, and played one game with them during the 2009–10 season.

Playing career 
Motin joined Färjestads BK's junior team in 2005. The following year, Motin was called up to play with Färjestads' senior team. He made his debut against Timrå IK on December 7, 2006. Since that game, he became a regular player in Färjestads' line-up. Motin was ranked as a top prospect by the ISS, who in December 2007, ranked him as the 13th pick of the draft.

During his second season in the Elitserien, Motin struggled to get ice time and during December 2007, was he loaned to Bofors IK to get some more ice time and be better prepared for the World Junior Championships. After the WJC he returned to Färjestad and got an assist on a goal by Esa Pirnes in his first game back.

On June 21, 2008, Motin was drafted by the Edmonton Oilers of the National Hockey League (NHL), selecting him in the fourth round of the 2008 NHL Entry Draft, 103rd overall. On May 19, 2009, the Oilers announced that they had signed Motin to a three-year entry-level contract.

He was assigned to the Oilers' then American Hockey League affiliate, the Springfield Falcons, for the 2009–10 season. During the campaign, Motin was called up to the Edmonton Oilers on an emergency basis on March 3, 2010, and he played in his first-ever NHL game.

In the following season, Motin was reassigned to the Oilers' new AHL affiliate, the Oklahoma City Barons for their inaugural season. In the final year of his contract with the Oilers in 2011–12, Motin appeared in just 10 games with the Barons before opting from a release from his contract to return to Sweden with Timrå IK of the Elitserien on November 15, 2011.

International play

 

Motin represented Sweden at the 2008 World Junior Ice Hockey Championships and won a silver medal. In 2007, he also represented Sweden at U18 World Championship and won a bronze medal.

Personal life
Motin is of Finnish descent through his Finnish-born father.

Career statistics

Regular season and playoffs

International

See also
 List of players who played only one game in the NHL

References

External links
 

1989 births
Living people
Bofors IK players
Edmonton Oilers draft picks
Edmonton Oilers players
Färjestad BK players
Oklahoma City Barons players
Örebro HK players
People from Karlskoga Municipality
Sportspeople from Örebro County
Springfield Falcons players
Stockton Thunder players
Swedish ice hockey defencemen
Swedish people of Finnish descent
Timrå IK players